John Brown (1862 – unknown) was an English first-class cricketer active 1888 who played for Nottinghamshire. He was born in Bingham.

References

1862 births
Date of death unknown
English cricketers
Nottinghamshire cricketers